The Diocese of Vellore is one among the 24 dioceses of Church of South India. The motto chosen for the diocese was "In the Cross of Christ I Glory" (based on Galatians chapter 6 verse 14). Its emblem includes a banyan tree - the tree under which the Scudder brothers prayed before they decided to begin their work in the area of Vellore.

History
The diocese was created by bifurcating the western half of the Diocese of Madras and was officially formed on 26 January 1976. Vellore Diocese is predominantly rural and crosses the state boundaries of Tamil Nadu and Andhra Pradesh. So Vellore Diocese can be also called a bilingual diocese.

Area Councils 
 Eastern Area Council  -  26 Pastorates
 Central Area Council  -  37 Pastorates
 Southern Area Council -  17 Pastorates
 Northern Area Council -  24 Pastorates

Two more Councils were in proposal, (Viz: Central Urban Area Council & Western Area Council)

Bishops of the diocese 

 Sam J. Ponniah (1978–1987)
 R. Trinity Baskeran
 Mahimai Rufus 
 Y. William (2008–2012)
 A. Rajavelu (201230 June 2018) Elected from CSI Christ Church, Gandhinagar, Vellore
 Sharma Nithiyanandam (as of 2019)Elected from CSI Christ Church, Gandhinagar, Vellore

Institutions under CSI Vellore Diocese
Church of South India Vellore Diocese has 105 elementary schools, 5 high schools, 5 higher secondary schools, 2 teachers' training institutes, 4 primary schools, 1 arts & science college, 3 Matriculation higher secondary schools, 2 nursing schools and 2 hospitals.
Hospitals 
CSI Hospital, Vandavasi
Scudder Memorial Hospital, Ranipet
Nursing Schools
School of Nursing, Ranipet
School of Nursing, Vandavasi
Higher Secondary Schools
Wyckoff Higher Secondary School, Muttathur
Voorhees Higher Secondary School, Vellore
CSI Christ Matriculation School for Girls, Tirupattur
CSI SIPCOT Matriculation Higher Secondary School
Arts & Science College
Voorhees College, Vellore

St. John's Church, Vellore Fort

St. John's Church, Vellore located inside the Vellore Fort was raised in 1846 by the Government of Madras for the officers and men of the East India Company military station. The church is named after St. John the Evangelist. However, the church was never officially consecrated and hence not officially named St. John’s Church. St. John's Church is the oldest standing church in the Vellore Diocese.

See also
Church of South India
Diocese of Coimbatore
Diocese of Madras
Madurai-Ramnad Diocese
Thoothukudi - Nazareth Diocese
Tirunelveli Diocese
Trichy-Tanjore Diocese
Diocese of Kanyakumari
Joseph John (minister)

References

External links
 http://csivellorediocese.com/index.php

Vellore
Christian organizations established in 1976
1976 establishments in India
Vellore